Ulmus 'Morton Stalwart' (selling name ), is a Morton Arboretum hybrid cultivar arising from a controlled crossing of  with the hybrid of a Field Elm U. minor from eastern Russia and a Siberian Elm U. pumila. Tested in the US National Elm Trial coordinated by Colorado State University,  averaged a survival rate of 85% after 10 years.

Description
The branches are upright, but the form of the tree is more oval than vase-shaped; the leaves are relatively large.

Pests and diseases
Although resistant to Dutch elm disease in the United States, the tree is moderately susceptible to insects, notably elm leaf beetle Xanthogaleruca luteola, Japanese beetle and Gypsy moth.

Cultivation
 is vigorous and robust, adjudged the third fastest-growing cultivar of 17 assessed by the University of Minnesota and fourth out of 15 in trials at U C Davis. The tree is also extremely tolerant of drought and cold; in artificial freezing tests at the Morton Arboretum the tree was found cold-hardy to −40°C.

 was introduced by Chicagoland Grows and is currently being evaluated in the National Elm Trial coordinated by Colorado State University. The tree was introduced to the UK in 2014, but is not known (2016) to have been introduced to Australasia.

Accessions
North America
Arnold Arboretum, US. Acc. no. 131–2002
Bickelhaupt Arboretum, US. Acc. no. 02–018
Brenton Arboretum, US. 5 trees, acquired 2009. Acc. no. not known.
Chicago Botanic Garden, US. 1 tree, planted in the Parking Lots; no other details available.
Dawes Arboretum , US. 2 trees, no acc. details available.
Holden Arboretum, US. Acc. no. 00–124
Morton Arboretum, US. Acc. nos. 274–97, 109–2006.
Smith College, US. Acc. no. 36405
University of Idaho Arboretum, US. Two trees. Acc. no. 2000089
Europe
Grange Farm Arboretum, Lincolnshire, UK. Acc. no. 1141.

References

Hybrid elm cultivar
Ulmus articles with images
Ulmus